In astronomy, a resonant trans-Neptunian object is a trans-Neptunian object (TNO) in mean-motion orbital resonance with Neptune. The orbital periods of the resonant objects are in a simple integer relations with the period of Neptune, e.g. 1:2, 2:3, etc. Resonant TNOs can be either part of the main Kuiper belt population, or the more distant scattered disc population.

Distribution 

The diagram illustrates the distribution of the known trans-Neptunian objects. Resonant objects are plotted in red.
Orbital resonances with Neptune are marked with vertical bars: 1:1 marks the position of Neptune's orbit and its trojans; 2:3 marks the orbit of Pluto and plutinos; and 1:2, 2:5, etc. mark a number of smaller families. The designation 2:3 or 3:2 both refer to the same resonance for TNOs. There is no ambiguity, because TNOs have, by definition, periods longer than Neptune's. The usage depends on the author and the field of research.

Origin 

Detailed analytical and numerical studies of Neptune's resonances have shown that the objects must have a relatively precise range of energies. If the object's semi-major axis is outside these narrow ranges, the orbit becomes chaotic, with widely changing orbital elements. As TNOs were discovered, more than 10% were found to be in 2:3 resonances, far from a random distribution. It is now believed that the objects have been collected from wider distances by sweeping resonances during the migration of Neptune. Well before the discovery of the first TNO, it was suggested that interaction between giant planets and a massive disk of small particles would, via angular-momentum transfer, make Jupiter migrate inwards and make Saturn, Uranus, and especially Neptune migrate outwards. During this relatively short period of time, Neptune's resonances would be sweeping the space, trapping objects on initially varying heliocentric orbits into resonance.

Known populations

1:1 resonance (Neptune trojans, period ~164.8 years) 

A few objects have been discovered following orbits with semi-major axes similar to that of Neptune, near the Sun–Neptune Lagrangian points. These Neptune trojans, termed by analogy to the (Jupiter) Trojan asteroids, are in 1:1 resonance with Neptune. 28 are known as of February 2020. Only 5 objects are near Neptune's  Lagrangian point, and the identification of one of these is insecure; the others are located in Neptune's  region.

Leading Trojans at 

 
 
 
 
 
 
 
 
 
 
 
 
 
 
 
 
 
 
 
 
 
 

Following Trojans at 

 
 
 
 
  ?

2:3 resonance ("plutinos", period ~247.94 years) 

The 2:3 resonance at 39.4 AU is by far the dominant category among the resonant objects. As of February 2020, it includes 383 confirmed and 99 possible member bodies (such as ). Of these 383 confirmed plutinos, 338 have their orbits secured in simulations run by the Deep Ecliptic Survey. The objects following orbits in this resonance are named plutinos after Pluto, the first such body discovered. Large, numbered plutinos include:

3:5 resonance (period ~275 years) 

As of February 2020, 47 objects are confirmed to be in a 3:5 orbital resonance with Neptune. Among the numbered objects there are:

4:7 resonance (period ~290 years) 

Another population of objects is orbiting the Sun at 43.7 AU (in the midst of the classical objects). The objects are rather small (with two exceptions, H>6) and most of them follow orbits close to the ecliptic. , 55 4:7-resonant objects have had their orbits secured by the Deep Ecliptic Survey. Objects with well established orbits include:

 
 
 
 
 
 
 
 385446 Manwë

1:2 resonance ("twotinos", period ~330 years) 

This resonance at 47.8 AU is often considered to be the outer edge of the Kuiper belt, and the objects in this resonance are sometimes referred to as twotinos. Twotinos have inclinations less than 15 degrees and generally moderate eccentricities between 0.1 and 0.3. An unknown number of the 2:1 resonants likely did not originate in a planetesimal disk that was swept by the resonance during Neptune's migration, but were captured when they had already been scattered.

There are far fewer objects in this resonance than plutinos. Johnston's Archive counts 99 while simulations by the Deep Ecliptic Survey have confirmed 73 as of February 2020.
Long-term orbital integration shows that the 1:2 resonance is less stable than the 2:3 resonance; only 15% of the objects in 1:2 resonance were found to survive 4 Gyr as compared with 28% of the plutinos. Consequently, it might be that twotinos were originally as numerous as plutinos, but their population has dropped significantly below that of plutinos since.

Objects with well established orbits include (in order of the absolute magnitude):

2:5 resonance (period ~410 years) 
There are 57 confirmed 2:5-resonant objects as of February 2020.

Objects with well established orbits at 55.4 AU include:

 , dwarf candidate
 
 
 
 
 
 472235 Zhulong

1:3 resonance (period ~500 years) 
Johnston's Archive counts 14 1:3-resonant objects as of February 2020. A dozen of these are secure according to the Deep Ecliptic Survey:

 
 
 
 
 
 
 
 ?
 
 
 
 ?

Other resonances 

As of February 2020, the following higher-order resonances are confirmed for a limited number of objects:

Haumea

Haumea is thought to be in an intermittent 7:12 orbital resonance with Neptune. Its ascending node  precesses with a period of about 4.6 million years, and the resonance is broken twice per precession cycle, or every 2.3 million years, only to return a hundred thousand years or so later. Marc Buie qualifies it as non-resonant.

Coincidental versus true resonances 

One of the concerns is that weak resonances may exist and would be difficult to prove due to the current lack of accuracy in the orbits of these distant objects. Many objects have orbital periods of more than 300 years and most have only been observed over a relatively short observation arc of a few years. Due to their great distance and slow movement against background stars, it may be decades before many of these distant orbits are determined well enough to confidently confirm whether a resonance is true or merely coincidental. A true resonance will smoothly oscillate while a coincidental near resonance will circulate. (See Toward a formal definition)

Simulations by Emel'yanenko and Kiseleva in 2007 show that  is librating in a 3:7 resonance with Neptune. This libration can be stable for less than 100 million to billions of years.

Emel'yanenko and Kiseleva also show that  appears to have less than a 1% probability of being in a 3:7 resonance with Neptune, but it does execute circulations near this resonance.

Toward a formal definition 

The classes of TNO have no universally agreed precise definitions, the boundaries are often unclear and the notion of resonance is not defined precisely. The Deep Ecliptic Survey introduced formally defined dynamical classes based on long-term forward integration of orbits under the combined perturbations from all four giant planets. (see also formal definition of classical KBO)

In general, the mean-motion resonance may involve not only orbital periods of the form 

where p and q are small integers, λ and λN are respectively the mean longitudes of the object and Neptune, but can also involve the longitude of the perihelion and the longitudes of the nodes (see orbital resonance, for elementary examples)

An object is resonant if for some small integers (p,q,n,m,r,s), the argument (angle) defined below is librating (i.e. is bounded):

The term libration denotes here periodic oscillation of the angle around some value and is opposed to circulation where the angle can take all values from 0 to 360°. For example, in the case of Pluto, the resonant angle  librates around 180° with an amplitude of around 86.6° degrees, i.e. the angle changes periodically from 93.4° to 266.6°.

All new plutinos discovered during the Deep Ecliptic Survey proved to be of the type

similar to Pluto's mean-motion resonance.

More generally, this 2:3 resonance is an example of the resonances p:(p+1) (for example 1:2, 2:3, 3:4) that have proved to lead to stable orbits. Their resonant angle is

In this case, the importance of the resonant angle  can be understood by noting that when the object is at perihelion, i.e. , then 

i.e.  gives a measure of the distance of the object's perihelion from Neptune.
The object is protected from the perturbation by keeping its perihelion far from Neptune provided  librates around an angle far from 0°.

Classification methods 

As the orbital elements are known with a limited precision, the uncertainties may lead to false positives (i.e. classification as resonant of an orbit which is not). A recent approach considers not only the current best-fit orbit but also two additional orbits corresponding to the uncertainties of the observational data. In simple terms, the algorithm determines whether the object would be still classified as resonant if its actual orbit differed from the best fit orbit, as the result of the errors in the observations. The three orbits are numerically integrated over a period of 10 million years. If all three orbits remain resonant (i.e. the argument of the resonance is librating, see formal definition), the classification as a resonant object is considered secure. If only two out of the three orbits are librating the object is classified as probably in resonance. Finally, if only one orbit passes the test, the vicinity of the resonance is noted to encourage further observations to improve the data. The two extreme values of the semi-major axis used in the algorithm are determined to correspond to uncertainties of the data of at most 3 standard deviations. Such range of semi-axis values should, with a number of assumptions, reduce the probability that the actual orbit is beyond this range to less than 0.3%. The method is applicable to objects with observations spanning at least 3 oppositions.

References

Further reading 
 
 
 
  (as HTML)